The United States Department of Defense acknowledges holding one Swedish captive in Guantanamo.

Mehdi Mohammad Ghezali, the sole Swedish captive in Guantanamo, was repatriated prior to the institution of the Combatant Status Review Tribunals.
He was the subject of a feature-length documentary that has received worldwide distribution.

Ghazali was apprehended by Pakistani authorities in August 2009 with a dozen other individuals.
Pakistani security officials claim the travelers  planned to travel to Miranshah to meet with a Taliban leader.  Ghezali says they were traveling to Lahore to attend a Tablighi Jamaat conference.

A young Swedish couple, Munir Awad and Safia Benaouda, who were visiting Somalia when it was invaded by Kenyan and Ethiopian forces in 2007, reported being captured by Kenyan soldiers who were led by Americans.  
They reported being held in secret detention centres run with American oversight, and being interrogated by American interrogators.  They were set free after several months of extrajudicial detention.
They were later captured with Ghezali in Pakistan.

References

Lists of Guantanamo Bay detainees by nationality
Sweden–United States relations